Workmore is an unincorporated community in Telfair County, Georgia, United States.

Workmore is located at about the center of the county, between McRae-Helena (the county seat) and Jacksonville, and between Milan and Lumber City. Because Workmore is unincorporated, it is serviced totally by the county government. The town was named after a large working farm named Workmore, which was one of several farms owned by William Henry Reviere (1862-1936) of Rochelle in Wilcox County, Georgia. The Revieres donated the land for the Workmore High School which opened in 1922, and a reunion at the Workmore High School is held annually.

Notes

Unincorporated communities in Telfair County, Georgia
Unincorporated communities in Georgia (U.S. state)